Dodro is a municipality of  northwestern Spain in the province of A Coruña, in the autonomous community of Galicia. It is located along with lower reaches and at the mouth of the Ulla river, which is a continuation of the Ría de Arosa.

References

Municipalities in the Province of A Coruña